Lucas Lasserre (born March 9, 1978) is a French racing driver who competes in the NASCAR Whelen Euro Series. He is currently driving the No. 64 Ford Mustang as the owner-driver of SpeedHouse.

Racing career 
Lasserre started racing karts in France and dominated Formula Renault and Spanish Formula Three before moving to sports cars and GT cars for Panoz in European Le Mans Series and Lamborghini Japan in Super GT. He also worked as a manufacturer for Renault Sport, Michelin, Oreca, and Norma Auto Concept from 2003 to 2008. He has also raced in the 24 Hours of Le Mans' LMP1 class.

In July 2008, he created the event promotion company Carre Sport, which oversaw the EffiTIC-Carre Sport cars. The company, in default, was put into liquidation in February 2012.

In 2009, he joined the new Racecar Euro Series and he won the Elite class title to become the inaugural champions of the series. Lasserre successfully defended his title in 2010. As a reward for becoming a double champion, he received an invitation to compete in the 2011 edition of the Toyota All-Star Showdown at Irwindale Speedway and despite qualifying in 38th, he would finish the race in 15th place.

After leaving the Euro Series in 2011, Lasserre returned in 2017 for his first season in the Euro Series under NASCAR official sanctioning. He initially competes with Dog Racing before switching to Mishumotors mid-season. The following year, he returned to compete full-time with Mishumotors in the No. 33 team. He scored his first victory in the NASCAR-sanctioned era of Euro Series at the second Elite 1 race at Franciacorta after initial race winner Alon Day was disqualified for failing post-race inspection. Lasserre would finish 3rd in the standings after scoring two further podiums at Hockenheim. 

Lasserre continued to compete with Mishumotors for the next two seasons, finishing 17th in the overall standings in 2019 and 4th in 2020. During the 2019 season, Lasserre started to field his own team SpeedHouse in the series. SpeedHouse competed part-time for the 2019 and 2020 seasons using a variety of drivers before the team made the step up to full-time competition in 2021, with Lasserre now acting as the team's primary driver. Lasserre went on to finish 3rd in the championship once again after scoring three podiums and 10 Top-10 finishes.

Racing record

Career summary
 1995: French Formula Renault ELF Campus  – Finished 7th of the Championship
 1998: French Formula Renault Championship – Finished 3rd of the Championship
 1999: Winner of the Championship – French Formula Renault Championship – Won 8 out of 12 events
 2000: French Formula 3 series – Finish 5th of the championship
 2001: French Formula 3 series – Team Signature
 2002: Spanish Formula 3 series – Team Racing Engineering – 3 wins & 5podiums finishes
 2003:
 French GT Championship – Driving for DDO Organisation – Porsche GT3 RSR
 24 Hours of Le Mans with Sezio Florida Racing Team – Qualified for the 24 Hours of Le Mans
 2004: French Tourism Championship: Team Tarrés
 2005: French Tourism Championship – Team Tarrés – Chrystler Viper GTS-R
 2006: French Tourism Championship – Team Tarrés
 2007:
 Official Driver Panoz Esperante GT LM – LMS Championship – Team LNT
 French Tourism Championship – Team Mirabeau Competition
 2009: Winner of the Elite Championship – NASCAR Whelen Euro Series
 2010: Winner of the Elite Championship – NASCAR Whelen Euro Series
 2011:
 Finished 3rd in the Championship – Porsche Carrera Cup
 NASCAR K&N Pro Series – Toyota Allstars Showdown at Irwindale: Finish 15th (First time on an Oval Race)
 2014:
 European Le Mans Series
 24 Heures de spa with Team Pro GT by Almeras: 7th Pro Am
 2017: NASCAR Whelen Euro Series – Team Dog Racing & Mishumotors
 2018: NASCAR Whelen Euro Series – Team Mishumotors
 2019: NASCAR Whelen Euro Series – Team Mishumotors
 2020: NASCAR Whelen Euro Series – Team Mishumotors
 2021: NASCAR Whelen Euro Series – Team SpeedHouse

NASCAR
(key) (Bold – Pole position awarded by qualifying time. Italics – Pole position earned by points standings or practice time. * – Most laps led.)

Whelen Euro Series – EuroNASCAR PRO

References

External links 
 
 

1978 births
French racing drivers
NASCAR drivers
Living people
Racing Engineering drivers